Baynard may refer to:

Places
Baynard House, London
Baynard's Castle
Castle Baynard

People
Ann Baynard (1672–1697), British philosopher
Edward Baynard (disambiguation), several people
Fulk Baynard ( 1226), English landowner and judge
Richard Baynard ( 1371–1434), English politician